Russell Zguta (born October 3, 1949) is a US historian, educator, and professor emeritus at the University of Missouri.

Zguta is a native of Ukraine.  Born as Jaroslav Zguta, he was given the name "Russell" upon his enrollment in first grade; it was deemed more American.

He received his Bachelor of Arts in History from Saint Francis University in 1964, and his Masters (1965) and Ph.D. (1967) from Pennsylvania State University.

Zguta's research has focused on Middle Age and early Modern Slavic and Russian culture.

In 1979, Choice magazine included his book Russian Minstrels: A History of the Skomorokhi (1978) in its Outstanding Academic Books list for that year. His other publications include "Witchcraft Trials in Seventeenth-Century Russia" in The American Historical Review (1977); "The One-Day Votive Church: A Religious Response to the Black Death in Early Russia" in Slavic Review (1981); and the "Monastic Medicine in Kievan Rus' and Early Muscovy" chapter in Medieval Russian Culture (1984).

While at the University of Missouri, Zguta chaired multiple departments: History (1989-1991 and 2010-2013), Economics (1991-1995), and Romance Literature (2005-2008).  In 1990, he received the Purple Chalk Award (where the winner is chosen by a student vote) "for exemplary teaching and advising".

In October 2016, the Central Slavic Conference, a regional affiliate of ASEEES, presented Zguta with its Presidential Award for "his lifetime of support of the Central Slavic Conference and untiring promotion of Slavic studies".

Articles 
 Zguta, Russell. “Skomorokhi: The Russian Minstrel-Entertainers.” Slavic Review 31, no. 2 (1972): 297–313.
Zguta, Russell. “Witchcraft Trials in Seventeenth-Century Russia.” The American Historical Review 82, no. 5 (1977): 1187–1207.

References 

Living people
Russian studies scholars
Soviet emigrants to the United States
University of Missouri faculty
Pennsylvania State University alumni
Saint Francis University alumni
20th-century American male writers
20th-century American non-fiction writers
American male non-fiction writers
1949 births